José María Morelos is the municipal seat and largest city in José María Morelos Municipality in the Mexican state of Quintana Roo. According to the 2010 census, the city's population was 11,750 persons.

José María Morelos was established in the 19th century with the purpose of exporting wood and chicle. When Quintana Roo became a state in 1974, the place was renamed after the revolutionary rebel leader José María Morelos, and it became the seat of the namesake municipality.

References

External links
 

Populated places in Quintana Roo